Niphecyra papyri is a species of beetle in the family Cerambycidae. It was described by Lepesme in 1949.

References

Crossotini
Beetles described in 1949